The Falkirk Steeple is a landmark which dominates the skyline of Falkirk in central Scotland. The present structure on the High Street was built in 1814, and replaced an earlier steeple dating from the late 17th century, which itself replaced a still earlier structure. The Falkirk Steeple is protected as a category A listed building. A stylised image of the steeple appears on the crest of Falkirk Football Club.

History
The present steeple dates from 1814, and was designed by the architect David Hamilton in a classical style.

The steeple was damaged in 1927 when it was struck by lightning, causing the spire to be destroyed. It was subsequently replaced.

The steeple contains 2 prison cells, male lower and female upper, which were in use until the new prison was opened in the 1860s.

Old steeple
The previous steeple, which stood on the same site, was constructed in 1697 and served as the town's tolbooth and temporary gaol until the late 18th century. This was demolished after construction of an adjacent building in 1803 caused the steeple to subside.

References

External links
Falkirk Steeple Box Office, Falkirk Community Trust
Walk 2, Falkirk Town Centre 2, Falkirk Local History Society

Category A listed buildings in Falkirk (council area)
Listed government buildings in Scotland
Buildings and structures in Falkirk
Clock towers in the United Kingdom
1814 establishments in Scotland
Towers completed in 1814